Waterloo Christian School is a private K-12 Christian school in Waterloo, Iowa.

History
Waterloo Christian School, formerly Walnut Ridge Baptist Academy, was founded in 1973 as a ministry of Walnut Ridge Baptist Church. Church members wanted a place for their children to be educated from a Biblical perspective. The graduating class of 1988 were the first students to complete all grades from kindergarten through 12th grade.

See also
List of high schools in Iowa

Christian schools in Iowa
Private high schools in Iowa
Schools in Black Hawk County, Iowa
Private middle schools in Iowa
Private elementary schools in Iowa
Buildings and structures in Waterloo, Iowa
1973 establishments in Iowa